The Michigan Reformatory was a state prison for men located in Ionia, Ionia County, Michigan, owned and operated by the Michigan Department of Corrections.  The facility has 352 beds at Level II security and 797 beds at Level IV security.  

The Reformatory was first opened in 1877 and housed "high-risk offenders".  It closed in 2000 with the opening of the nearby Bellamy Creek Correctional Facility, then was reopened in 2007.  A Michigan House Appropriation Subcommittee recommended its closure again in 2012. The Michigan Reformatory closed this year in November 2022 as inmate numbers continue to decline. Inmates we’re spread around The area and relocated.

1981 Riot
On the night of May 22, 1981 a riot broke out at a cellblock housing about 500 inmates. 100 corrections officers and state police contained the inmates with tear gas. Three or four corrections officers were reported slightly injured in the disturbance, which began about 8:10 P.M. Arson, looting and vandalism, began shortly after damaging 30 buildings.

References

Prisons in Michigan
Buildings and structures in Ionia County, Michigan
1877 establishments in Michigan